The Alpena Flyer was an American automobile manufactured between 1910 and 1914 in Alpena, Michigan by the Alpena Motor Car Company. Approximately 480 cars in 13 models were produced, costing around $1,500, and just one car is known to exist today. The car was intended to be light and inexpensive, and to make Alpena into an "Automobile City", although this latter goal failed.

Details 
In 1911 the Alpena Flyer was advertised as “The Greatest, Biggest and Most Sensational Actual Values In The Automobile World For $1450.00." The Alpena Flyer was an assembled car produced as a standard Touring Car for 4 or 5 passengers, a four door 5 passenger Touring Car and a Roadster. Prices for the 1911 Alpena Flyer standard Touring Car was $1450.00, four door 5 passenger Touring $1600.00 and the Roadster was 1450.00.

The Alpena Flyer was designed for speed using unit engine/gearbox construction with three-point suspension. Specifications of the 1911 Alpena Flyer included a four-cylinder engine made by Northway or Rutenber. It had almost 40 horsepower, disc clutch, water cooled, a Splitdorf magneto, Schebler carburetor, sliding gear transmission with three speeds and reverse, 112 inch wheel base, 34 inch wheels and 24 inch x -inch tires, Torque tube drive, weight 2250 pounds and a color of only Dark Royal Blue.

The 1912 Alpena Flyer had 7 models, which included a 40-horsepower engine, 120" wheelbase, 36x4 tires,some electric lights, self-start, 3 oil lamps, 2 gas headlamps, and removable rims.

1912 Model J - Alpena "thirty" 4 door touring

1912 Model F - Alpena "forty" foredoor touring car

1912 Model G - Alpena "forty" Gentlemen's Speedster

History 
Alpena Motor Car ran into legal and financial problems shortly after this car was first built. In 1912, the company was sued for patent infringement over its suspension design. The patentee of this design, Emile Huber, brought suit against the company for using it without permission, and the car manufacturer was fined $400,000 for the offense. A cash shortage followed and the company was insolvent by 1914.

Of the several hundred cars built by Alpena Motor Car, just one example survives, and it is on display in Alpena at the Besser Museum. This example is a 1911 Standard Touring Alpena Flyer. It is "Dark Royal Blue," the only color the Flyers came in that year.

Production figures are sketchy but the company probably did not make more than 1,000 cars during its brief existence. A few hundred is probably a more reasonable estimate, despite the companies intentions to produce 3000 a year.

See also
Brass Era car

References

Burgess-Wise, David. The New Illustrated Encyclopedia of Automobiles.
https://www.roadandtrack.com/car-culture/a33445/alpena-flyer-one-left/
http://american-automobiles.com/alpena-flyer/

Brass Era vehicles